Boss of Bullion City is a 1940 American Western film directed by Ray Taylor and starring Johnny Mack Brown.

Maria Montez appears as the female lead. It was the first time she played a leading role and was the only one of her film roles where she speaks some Spanish.

Plot
Tom Bryant exposes a corrupt sheriff.

Cast
 Johnny Mack Brown as Tom Bryant
 Fuzzy Knight as Burt Pennycracker
 Nell O'Day as Martha Hadley
 Maria Montez as Linda Calhoun
 Harry Woods as Sheriff Jeff Salter
 Melvin Lang as Deputy Fred Wallace
 Dick Alexander as Steve
 Earle Hodgins as Mike Calhoun
 Karl Hackett as Deputy Tug
 George Humbert as Mario

References

External links 
 
 

1940 Western (genre) films
1940 films
American Western (genre) films
American black-and-white films
Films directed by Ray Taylor
1940s American films